David Mark Olphert (born 10 January 1969) is a former Irish first-class cricketer.

Olphert was born at Derry and was educated at Strabane High School. A useful batting all-rounder at club level, he played one first-class cricket match for Ireland against Australia A at Dublin in 1998. In a heavy Irish defeat, Olphert bowled four overs for 28 runs, without taking a wicket in the Australian's first-innings; batting twice in the match, he was dismissed in Ireland's first-innings without scoring by Adam Dale, while in their second-innings he was dismissed by Brendon Julian after making a single run. He was not selected again for Ireland after this match. Outside of cricket, he works as a plumber.

References

External links

1969 births
Living people
Sportspeople from Derry (city)
Cricketers from Northern Ireland
Irish cricketers